Steven J. Durham is a Colorado state politician.

He graduated from University of Northern Colorado. He was elected to the Colorado House of Representatives as a Republican in 1974, being re-elected in 1976 and 1979. In 1980 he was elected to the Colorado Senate, and in 1981 appointed a Regional Administrator for the Environmental Protection Agency. He left the post in 1983. He is currently a member of the Colorado State Board of Education.

References

Year of birth missing (living people)
Living people
Republican Party members of the Colorado House of Representatives
Republican Party Colorado state senators
School board members in Colorado